Hakea oligoneura is a small rare shrub known from only a few populations south of Perth, Western Australia growing exclusively on coastal limestone ridges. It has cream-white flowers and stiff, thick yellow-greenish leaves.

Description
Flat or rarely slightly inward curving leaves grow alternately along the stem. The leaves are thin and stiff, with toothed thorny margins on the edges with 1-4 longitudinal veins.

Taxonomy and naming
Hakea oligoneura was first formally described by Kelly Shepherd and Robyn Barker in 2009 and published in Nuytsia. The specific epithet  (oligoneura) is said to be derived from the Greek oligo meaning "few" and neuron meaning "nerve", referring to the lack of prominent secondary veins in the leaves, distinguishing it from other closely related species. The proper word in ancient Greek for "few" is however oligos (ὀλίγος).

Distribution and habitat
Hakea oligoneura has a restricted distribution known only in a few isolated populations in Yalgorup National Park  between Mandurah and Bundbury along the Western Australian coast. Hakea oligoneura grows on limestone ridges in white-brown sand in open mallee scrubland.

Conservation status
Hakea oligoneura is classified as "Priority Four" by the Government of Western Australia Department of Parks and Wildlife, meaning that is rare or near threatened, due to its restricted distribution.

References

External links
[/avh.ala.org.au/occurrences/search?taxa=Hakea+oligoneura#tab_mapView Occurrence data for Hakea oligoneura, Australasian Virtual Herbarium]

oligoneura
Eudicots of Western Australia
Plants described in 2009
Taxa named by Kelly Anne Shepherd
Taxa named by Robyn Mary Barker